Neil Barsky is an American journalist, former hedge fund manager, filmmaker, and philanthropist, best known for making the 2012 film Koch and for founding The Marshall Project, a journalism nonprofit intended to shed light on the United States criminal justice system.

Early life and education 
Barsky was born in the Bronx in New York City. He moved to Long Island and then New Jersey. In 1973, he returned to Long Island. He went to the Walden School for high school.

He is Jewish and attributes his support for social justice to his Jewish schooling and upbringing.

Barsky pursued his undergraduate studies at Oberlin College and a graduate degree in journalism at Columbia Journalism School.

Career

Hedge fund manager 
Barsky started work as an analyst for Morgan Stanley in 1993, working on commercial real estate and the gaming industry. Within a year, he got listed in the All-Star Analysts list of Institutional Investor.

In 1998, Barsky and fellow Morgan Stanley alumnus Scott M. Sipprelle started a hedge fund called Midtown Research. Barsky stayed with the fund until 2002. In November 2007, a few months before the global stock market collapse, Sipprelle closed down the fund. Sipprelle would subsequently become a venture capitalist and would also be the Republican candidate for the House of Representatives in 2010.

In 2002, Barsky left Midtown Research and opened his own hedge fund, Alson Capital Partners, named after his children, Alexandra and Davidson. The fund made successful investments in Sears Holdings and shorted newspaper and furniture companies. It also exited the housing sector in early 2006 before the bursting of the housing bubble, although Barsky incorrectly believed that there was no bubble. After correctly predicting the popularity of the Atkins diet, the fund shorted Panera Bread and Krispy Kreme.

At its peak, the fund would have $3.5 billion in assets under management. In 2008, as a result of the global financial crisis, Alson lost 24% of its assets, down to $1.5 billion, primarily due to its large holdings in energy and utility stocks, all of which fell more than 50% after producing big gains in previous years. At the end of May 2009, the fund shut down, returning $800 million to investors. Alson's former chief operating officer said that Barsky made sure that all employees had equity and got generous severance packages, so that the closure did not cause any of their lives to be ruined.

Over his entire career as an investor (August 1998 to March 2009) Barsky made an average 12.1% a year.

New York Times journalist Joe Nocera said that during his years as a hedge fund manager, Barsky was an important source of information about the workings of finance to Nocera, but was generally referenced anonymously because hedge fund managers feared that visibility would make investors think they weren't doing their job.

Journalist 
Barsky's interest in journalism was sparked by a high school project on the effect of busing legislation on communities in Boston. He failed to get a journalism job right out of college and therefore went to the Columbia Journalism School. In 1986, he started work in the news business, working the business desk at the New York Daily News. In 1988, he moved to the Wall Street Journal, where he covered commercial real estate and the gambling industry. He left the Journal in 1993 for a career in finance, where he would stay until 2009. Despite being successful in finance, Barsky continued to identify as a journalist. In 2009, after shutting down his hedge fund, Barsky renewed his exploration of journalism.

Barsky has been skeptical of journalism's almost-exclusive reliance on advertising for revenue, a skepticism that also informed his decision to short newspaper companies while operating his hedge fund. As chairman of the board of overseers of the Columbia Journalism Review, he encouraged the organization to play an important role in coming up with new business models. He similarly pushed the nonprofit Youth Communications to think about what projects would financially sustain the organization.

Barsky's interest in new models for journalism would eventually lead him to co-found The Marshall Project along with former New York Times executive editor Bill Keller. First announced in November 2013 by Barsky, the project got Keller on board in February 2014.

Journalistic coverage of Donald Trump 
Barsky has reported extensively on the business career of 45th President Donald Trump since 1985, mainly for The Wall Street Journal and The Daily News. He has interviewed Trump dozens of times over the course of his journalistic coverage. In 1991, Barsky won the Gerald Loeb Award for Deadline and/or Beat Writing for his "Coverage of the Collapse of Donald Trump's Financial Empire" while at The Wall Street Journal.

In August 2016, during Trump's presidential campaign, Barsky wrote a piece for The New York Times about his experience covering Trump as a businessman. He recounted when Trump was "on the brink of financial ruin" and noted that he was a "walking disaster as a businessman for much of his life," but also stated that he was "a skilled negotiator with an almost supernatural ability to pinpoint and attack his adversaries’ vulnerabilities, as several of his Republican primary opponents discovered."

Trump threatened to sue Barsky multiple times over the course of his journalistic coverage, though he never followed through. Trump wrote of Barsky in his 1997 book, The Art of the Comeback, "Of all the writers who have written about me, probably none has been more vicious than Neil Barsky of the Wall Street Journal."

Journalistic coverage of Rikers Island 
Following numerous revelations about stark conditions in the New York City jail complex, Barsky wrote an opinion piece for the New York Times titled "Shut Down Rikers Island" (July 19, 2015). In the piece, Barsky argued that 
"the only way to transform Rikers is to destroy it; it needs to be permanently closed. The buildings are crumbling. The guard culture of prisoner abuse and the gang culture of violence are ingrained. The complex is New York’s Guantánamo Bay: a secluded island, beyond the gaze of watchdogs, where the Constitution is no guide. It is a place that has outlived its usefulness."In this piece, Barsky later made the case that "the closing of the country’s most notorious jail would serve as a powerful message" for national criminal justice reform.

In March 2017, de Blasio announced his support for plans to close the Rikers Island complex through reducing the number of inmates from 10,000 to 5,000 and establishing a system of smaller jails in all five boroughs. These plans were released by an independent commission studying Rikers Island, created by City Council speaker Melissa Mark-Viverito. Previously, in February 2016, de Blasio had called the idea of shutting down Rikers Island a "noble concept," but described it as unrealistic due to the cost.

Filmmaker 
Barsky was inspired to work on documentaries after observing the success of Waiting for Superman and Gasland in sparking discussion about their respective underlying issues (charter schools and fracking). He produced and directed Koch, a documentary released in 2012 (and theatrically released February 2013) about the role that former New York City Mayor Ed Koch played in transforming the city in the 1980s.

Barsky was co-executive producer and director of the documentary Knuckleball!, the short documentary Witnesses NYC, and the Koch episode in the TV series documentary POV.

The Marshall Project 
The Marshall Project is a nonprofit journalistic organization started by Barsky that aims to cover issues related to criminal justice in the United States.

In his byline for an op-ed for the New York Times in November 2013, Neil Barsky mentioned that he was working on The Marshall Project, with a one-sentence description and a link to a preliminary website. In February 2014, former New York Times executive editor Bill Keller announced that he was joining the project to lead the editorial team. The project had two of its investigative journalism pieces published in Slate and the Washington Post respectively, and it launched in November 2014 with funding from Barsky and many other sources, including the Ford Foundation.

References 

American filmmakers
American male journalists
Jewish American journalists
American hedge fund managers
American philanthropists
Year of birth missing (living people)
Living people
Gerald Loeb Award winners for Deadline and Beat Reporting
Walden School (New York City) alumni
Oberlin College alumni
Prison abolitionists
Columbia University Graduate School of Journalism alumni
21st-century American Jews